Roméo Johnny Elvis Kiki Van Laeken (born 13 December 1992), better known by his stage name Roméo Elvis, is a Belgian rapper and hip hop artist. 

His career began with the release of two EPs in 2013 and 2014, titled Bruxelles c'est devenu la jungle and Famille nombreuse. In 2016, his album EP Morale was released. In 2017 and 2018, two more albums were released: Morale 2 and his reissue Morale 2 luxe (released from his collaboration with producer Le Motel). In 2019, he released an album titled Chocolat and another album in 2022 titled Tout Peut Arriver. He has close connections with Belgian band L'Or du Commun, duo Caballero & JeanJass, and French rapper Lomepal.

Biography 
Roméo Elvis was born on 13 December 1992 in Uccle, Belgium. Interested in music since his youth, he developed a style distinct from that of his father, the singer Marka, his mother, the comedian Laurence Bibot, and his younger sister, the singer and pianist Angèle. Roméo Elvis was raised in Linkebeek, in the southern suburbs of Brussels, and later relocated to Forest.

After college, he continued his secondary studies at Saint-Luc Tournai Institute where he learned to paint and draw. It was during this time that Elvis began rapping with his friends. His artistic training continued at ESA 75, in Brussels, where he studied photo-journalism. While continuing to practice rap, he became close to members of L'Or du Commun.

While his first EPs were being released, Roméo Elvis was working as a cashier at the supermarket chain Carrefour. Despite his success, he was not able to earn enough money from rapping alone. Shortly before the release of the album Bruxelles arrive, he quit his job and devoted himself solely to music. His newest EP, Morale 2luxe, was released on February 15, 2018. Morale 2luxe is a remake of his album, Morale 2, released in March 2017.

Elvis suffers from tinnitus, common among musicians. He has made references to this condition in many of his titles, such as L'oreille sifflante and Ma tête. In an interview with Radio Nova, he explained that if he could earn a substantial income from rapping he would donate some of it to fight the disease. 

In 2019 Elvis collaborated with French sportswear brand Lacoste to create a limited collection. However, after being named on social media for sexual assault he was dropped by the label.

Musical style and influence 
The musical style of Roméo Elvis has evolved with the progression of his projects. While developing old-school instrumentals and a flow with similar ambiance to his first two EPs, his collaboration with the producer Le Motel on Morale and Morale 2 profoundly changed his style. He currently allows himself to make more refrains and add electronic instrumentals, and in accord with the jazz of Le Motel, giving them a more current tone.

Elvis' influences are numerous: the Belgian group L'or du Commun with which he made his rapping debut is one of his main ones. Their style can also be recognized in his first two projects with group members. He also frequently mentions the rapper Caballero as someone who greatly inspired him; they met while Bruxelles arrive was being recorded. Concerning French rap, Elvis considers the rapper Alpha Wann of the group 1995 as "the rap master playing for me in terms of placement and in terms of how to say things in a very meaningful way". Fuzati, leader of Klub des Loosers, strongly influences the rapper. Primarily in his somber aspect, but also in the manner that the rapper holds plenty of derision towards life. He also references the masked rapper in many of his titles, like in Drôle de décision. Elvis is also a fan of the French artist Philippe Katerine.

Concerts and tours 
While he began performing at concerts while growing closer to L'Or du Commun, it was during the release of Morale, in 2015, that Roméo Elvis and Le Motel began touring, with 19 performances across Belgium, France, and Luxembourg. The release of Morale 2 also marked the beginning of another, bigger tour with 29 performances and concerts in several large festivals such as Dour Festival, Rock en Seine, le Printemps de Bourges, and Garorock.

Discography

Albums 

Others
 2018: Morale 2Luxe (with Le Motel)

EPs 
 2013: Bruxelles c'est devenu la jungle
 2014: Famille nombreuse
 2016: Morale (with Le Motel)
 2020: Maison

Singles

Featured in

Other songs

Collaborations 
 2013: L'Or du Commun – Lotus Bleu (feat. Roméo Elvis), in their EP L'Origine
 2013: L'Or du Commun – Mon Voisin (feat. Roméo Elvis), in L'Or du Commun's EP L'Origine
 2015: Primero – Deuxième Ombre (feat. Roméo Elvis), in Primero's EP Scénarios
 2015: Primero – Présidentielles (feat. Roméo Elvis), in Primero's EP Scénarios
 2015: Stikstof – Dobberman (feat. Roméo Elvis), in Stikstof's album Stikstof/02
 2016: L'Or du Commun – Mouton Noir (feat. Original Flow Mastaz and Roméo Elvis)
 2016: Phasm – Souvent (feat. Roméo Elvis), in Phasm's mixtape Phasmixtape Vol. 1
 2017: Caballero & JeanJass – Vrai ou faux (feat. Roméo Elvis), in their album Double Hélice 2
 2017: Heystap Squad – Pression (feat. Roméo Elvis), in their EP Pression
 2017: L'Or du Commun – Apollo (feat. Roméo Elvis), in their EP Zeppelin
 2017: Lomepal – Billet (feat. Roméo Elvis), in his album Flip
 2017: Lord Esperanza – Infiniment Vôtre (feat. Roméo Elvis), in his album Polaroïd
 2017: Roméo Elvis – Carrière, in The Alchemist's EP Paris L.A. Bruxelles
 2017: Therapie Taxi – Hit Sale (feat. Roméo Elvis), in their album Hit Sale
 2017: Ulysse – Acid (feat. Roméo Elvis)
 2017: Zwangere Guy – Low & Lowgisch (feat. Roméo Elvis), in his mixtape Zwangerschapsverlof Vol.3
 2018: Caballero & JeanJass – Incroyaux (feat. Roméo Elvis), in their album Double Hélice 3
 2018: Di-Meh – Ride (feat. Roméo Elvis), in Di-Meh's album Focus Part. 2
 2018: Her – On and On (feat. Roméo Elvis et AnnenMayKantereit), in the album Her
 2018: Le 77 – La Sape (feat. Roméo Elvis), in their album Bawlers
 2018: Myth Syzer – Ouais Bébé (feat. Roméo Elvis et Ichon), in his album Bisous
 2018: Myth Syzer – Tocard (feat. Roméo Elvis), in his album Bisous
 2018: Roméo Elvis – Il m'a trompé, on DJ Weedim's mixtape La Boulangerie Française Vol.2
 2018: Roméo Elvis – Méchant, on the original band of Tueurs
 2018: Senamo – C'est mon boulot (feat. Roméo Elvis), in Senamo's album Poison Bleu
 2018: Slimka – Crazy Horses (feat. Roméo Elvis et Malala), in Slimka's mixtape No Bad Vol.2
 2018: Lomepal – 1000 °C (feat. Roméo Elvis)
 2018: Angèle – Tout oublier (feat. Roméo Elvis) in her album Brol

Awards and nominations

NRJ Music Awards

Red Bull Elektropedia Award

References 

1992 births
Living people
Belgian rappers
French-language singers of Belgium